Meteor Records was a Memphis-based R&B record label ran by Lester Bihari, one of the Bihari brothers, owners of Modern Records in Los Angeles. Founded in 1952, the label was a bold experiment to broaden the talent base by focusing on signing and recording Southern regional talent by having recording studios locally available.

The label's first release, "I Believe" / "I Held My Baby Last Night," by Elmore James in 1952 was their biggest success. By 1956 it was clear that the growing teenage rock 'n roll market was not buying Southern based blues. In 1957, Meteor Records issued its last recording and the Bihari brothers consolidated their labels in Los Angeles. Although the label did not succeed economically, it was an innovative effort on the part of the Bihari brothers to broaden the musical base.

Roster 
Elmore James was the first artist signed to the label and recorded the first release followed by Bep Brown's "Round House Boogie" / "Kickin' The Blues Around." Essentially the label picked up artists who didn't have success at Sun Records, including James, Rufus Thomas, Junior Thompson, Charlie Feathers, and Malcolm Yelvington. Bihari licensed some sides of jazz musician Al Smith from Chance Records in 1953.

List of artists who recorded for Meteor included:

 Elmore James
 Bep Brown 
 Chicago Sunny Boy
 Rufus Thomas
 Charlie Feathers
 Malcolm Yelvington
 Earl Forest
 Smokey Hogg
 Sunny Blair
 Little Milton
 Jimmy Haggett
 The Velvatones
 Minnie Thomas
 The Del-Rios
 Junior Thompson

See also
 List of record labels

References

American record labels
Record labels established in 1952
Record labels disestablished in 1957
Blues record labels
Rhythm and blues record labels
Companies based in Memphis, Tennessee